Etoko may refer to:
Etoko, Cameroon, a village in Cameroon
Etoko, Russia, a village (selo) in the Kabardino-Balkar Republic, Russia
Etoko River, a river in the Kabardino-Balkar Republic, Russia
Etoko, Uganda, a village in Uganda and parts entering Democratic Republic of Congo

See also
 Etoka (disambiguation)